Shefford is a town and civil parish located in the Central Bedfordshire district of Bedfordshire, England.  At the 2021 census it had a population of 7,311.

The town gives its name to Shefford, Quebec.

History

Roman remains were discovered in Shefford in the early nineteenth century.

The labouring-class poet Robert Bloomfield (the shoemaker poet) died in Shefford after his publishers went bankrupt and Bloomfield was forced to move from London into a cottage rented to him by a friend.  In Shefford one of his daughters died in 1814 and his wife became insane. In order to support himself he tried to carry on business as a bookseller but failed, and in his later years was reduced to making Aeolian harps which he sold among his friends.  With failing eyesight, his own reason threatened by depression, he died in great poverty in the town in 1823.  He was buried at Campton, as was usual for those dying in Shefford.

Between 1868 and 1974 Shefford was the site of St Francis' Boy's Home (orphanage) that was situated on High Street next to the Roman Catholic Church dedicated to St Francis of Assisi. The church remains in use as a place of worship. The orphanage buildings, which are seen on the right of the picture, have been turned into flats. The orphanage buildings are the most imposing in the town and date from the 1880s. Many files regarding the home can be found at the Bedfordshire and Luton Archives and Records Service at Borough Hall in Bedford. There are Home Office and Department for Education Inspection Reports available that cover the period from 1962 to 1969.

During World War II an entire Jewish children's community came into being in Shefford as 500 pupils from Judith Grunfeld's school were billeted in and around the town. The school was moved in 1939 and remained in Shefford until 1945. This was part of "Operation Pied Piper" where schools were moved in anticipation of wartime bombing. A book was written about this time, titled "Shefford: The Story of a Jewish School Community in Evacuation, 1939-1945", telling the story of the evacuated school.

Geography

The River Flit and the River Hit run through the town. The Flit runs from Flitwick and joins the River Ivel on the edge of Shefford. The Ivel eventually joins the River Great Ouse just north of Sandy.

The name Shefford is derived from sheep-ford because there had been a sheep market and ford crossings over the two rivers that run through the town.

Shefford Hardwick was a hamlet located west of the parish, north of Ampthill Road. The rural settlement became a civil parish in its own right in 1858, but was merged into the parish of Shefford in 1933 as the farmstead expanded.

Facilities
Shefford incorporates a fire station, bowls club, sports club, a Memorial Hall, a Community Hall, many pubs and a brewery. As well as this, it has a variety of restaurants, including Chinese takeaways, award-winning Indian takeaways/restaurants, Turkish takeaway/restaurant and a fish and chip shop. Shefford has two petrol stations, two car dealers, and two pharmacies. There are three estate agents, a newsagent, a convenience store, a charity shop, an angling centre, a bakery, a tea room, a wine bar, a Post Office with sorting facilities an ironmonger/building supply centre, and the Banks and Taylor micro brewery (est. 1982).

There is a small industrial estate built on the site of the goods yard at Shefford railway station (closed 1962).

There are two small supermarkets in town and one on the outskirts, a travel agent and a public library.

There are four Churches - Anglican, Baptist, Methodist and Roman Catholic. Several schools and nurseries, and a large medical practice.

The town has a scout group, Guiding Groups and a local Army Cadet Force hut at Chicksands on the Army Intelligence Corps base, which is part of Bedfordshire and Hertfordshire ACF, in 4 Company.

Education
The areas around Shefford are served by the middle school Robert Bloomfield Academy which  has a Grade 1 (outstanding) Ofsted report, Samuel Whitbread Academy, Shefford Lower School, Shefford Nursery, BEST nursery and Acorn Pre-School & The Mighty Oaks.

Sport and leisure

Shefford has a Non-League football club Shefford Town & Campton F.C. who play at STMA (Digswell). It is where Jack Collison (Wales and West Ham Footballer) grew up and went to school.  There is also a Shefford Saints (Junior) FC where girls and boys from Shefford and the surrounding villages are able to join from the U5 Development squad up to U16 merging into the Adult team.

A modern, concrete skatepark is currently in the planning stages to be constructed on the new building site located off of Campton road.

References

External links

 Shefford Town Council website
 Shefford pages at the Bedfordshire and Luton Archives and Records Service

Market towns in Bedfordshire
Towns in Bedfordshire
Civil parishes in Bedfordshire
Central Bedfordshire District